This is a list of the main career statistics of Chinese professional tennis player, Li Na. Over the course of her career, Li won nine WTA singles titles, including two Grand Slam singles titles at the 2011 French Open and 2014 Australian Open and one Premier 5 singles title at the 2012 Western & Southern Open. She also finished in fourth place at the 2008 Beijing Olympics and was the runner-up at the 2011 and 2013 Australian Open and 2013 WTA Tour Championships. Li achieved a career-high singles ranking of world No. 2 on February 17, 2014.

Career achievements

On October 3, 2004, Li defeated Martina Suchá in the final of the Guangzhou International Women's Open to become the first Chinese woman to win a singles title on the WTA Tour. At the 2006 Wimbledon Championships, Li became the first Chinese player to be seeded in a Grand Slam event. She went on to reach the quarterfinals, becoming the first Chinese player in history (male or female) to achieve this feat but lost to second seed Kim Clijsters.

In January 2010, Li and her compatriot Zheng Jie reached the semifinals of the 2010 Australian Open in singles. This marked the first time in history where two Chinese players had reached the semifinals of a Grand Slam tournament simultaneously. Following this event, Li became the first Chinese player in history to achieve a top ten ranking in singles. Later that year, Li reached the quarterfinals of Wimbledon, losing to the eventual champion Serena Williams (this being the fourth Grand Slam tournament in a row in which Li had lost to the eventual champion).

At the 2011 Australian Open, Li defeated world No. 1 Caroline Wozniacki in the semifinals in three sets, saving a match point in the second set to become the first Chinese player in history to reach a Grand Slam final in singles. However, she lost to Kim Clijsters in three sets. At the 2011 French Open, Li defeated Petra Kvitová in the fourth round to become the first Chinese player in history to reach the quarterfinals or better at all four Grand Slam events in singles. She then defeated Victoria Azarenka and Maria Sharapova in the quarterfinals and semifinals respectively en route to her second consecutive Grand Slam final, where she defeated the defending champion, Francesca Schiavone, in straight sets to win her first Grand Slam singles title and thus became the first player from Asia to achieve such a feat. She achieved a new career high singles ranking of world No. 4 following the event. Following her strong performances throughout the year, Li qualified for the year-ending WTA Tour Championships, becoming the first Chinese player in history to do so. She finished the year ranked world No. 5, becoming the first Chinese player to finish a year ranked in the top ten.

In January 2013, Li won the first edition of the Shenzhen Open with a three set victory over Klára Zakopalová in the final. At the 2013 Australian Open, Li reached her third Grand Slam singles final without dropping a set but lost to world No. 1 and defending champion Victoria Azarenka in three sets. Later that year, Li reached the semifinals of the US Open and the final of the WTA Tour Championships for the first time in her career. She finished the year at a career-high singles ranking of world No. 3.

In January 2014, Li successfully defended her title at the Shenzhen Open before winning her second Grand Slam singles title at the 2014 Australian Open, defeating Dominika Cibulková in the final in straight sets. On February 17, 2014, Li became the highest ranked Asian player in history when she rose to a career-high singles ranking of world No. 2.

Performance timeline
Only main-draw results in WTA Tour, Grand Slam tournaments, Fed Cup and Olympic Games are included in win–loss records.

Singles

Doubles

Significant finals

Grand Slam tournament finals

Singles: 4 (2 titles, 2 runner-ups)

Olympic finals

Singles: 1 bronze medal match

Year-end championships

Singles: 1 (1 runner-up)

WTA Premier Mandatory & Premier 5 finals

Singles: 4 (1 title, 3 runner-ups)

WTA career finals

Singles: 21 (9 titles, 12 runner-ups)

Doubles: 2 (2 titles)

ITF finals

Singles: 20 (19 titles, 1 runner–up)

Doubles: 21 (16 titles, 5 runner–ups)

WTA Tour career earnings
Li earned more than 16 million dollars during her career.

Career Grand Slam statistics

Seedings 
The tournaments won by Li are in boldface, and advanced into finals by Li are in italics.

Best Grand Slam results details
Grand Slam winners are in boldface, and runner–ups are in italics.

Head-to-head vs. top 10 players
Li's record against players who have been ranked in the top 10. Active players are in boldface.

No. 1 wins

Top 10 wins

Notes

References

External links
 
 
 

Tennis career statistics
Li Na